The M5 is a long metropolitan route in the eThekwini Metropolitan Municipality, South Africa. It starts in KwaMashu in the north-western townships of Durban. It passes through the townships of KwaMashu, Newlands East, Newlands West, Ntuzuma and KwaDabeka. It then passes through the industrial town of New Germany and the leafy towns of Pinetown and Queensburgh before entering Durban and ending with the R102 in the Umbilo industrial area.

Route 

The northern terminus of the M5 is at the M25 (to Inanda)/R102 (to Durban) off-ramp with the R102 (to Phoenix) in the Duffs Road suburb of KwaMashu. It heads south-west as a dual-carriageway roadway named Dumisani Makhaye Drive and forms an intersection with the M45 Queen Nandi Drive. Turning east it passes the townships of KwaMashu and Newlands East. Here it intersects with the M21 Inanda Road and proceeds to head west-southwest between the townships of KwaMashu, Ntuzuma and Newlands West where it gains freeway status with the first off-ramp being the 'Newlands Expressway'. Just after Newlands Expressway, it turns north-west and ends being a freeway when it enters KwaDabeka at the uMngeni River. Here it intersects 'Ulwandle Drive' and regains freeway status, turning south-east through KwaDabeka. The M5 has 2 off-ramps for the remaining length of its freeway section which include 'Wyebank Road' and '1st Avenue'. After the 1st Avenue off-ramp, The M5 becomes Dinkelman Road, turning south towards New Germany and ends as a freeway at Posselt Road.

After the Posselt Road intersection, it becomes Otto Volek Road passing through the industrial town of New Germany before crossing over the M19 freeway which connects to Pinetown CBD and Westville at the exit 14 off-ramp south of New Germany. After the M19 intersection, the M5 enters Pinetown and intersects with the M31 'Josiah Gumede Road' where the M5 becomes Stapleton Road. Proceeding south-south-west, it crosses over the M13 freeway which connects to Westville at the exit 16 off-ramp in the Sarnia suburb of Pinetown. It turns left at a T-junction into Underwood Road, heading south-west and crossing over the N3 freeway. After the Baker Road intersection, it becomes Main Road where it turns south-south-east, passing through the Moseley suburb of Pinetown.

It crosses the M7 freeway which connects to Pinetown Central and Durban at the exit 12 off-ramp south of Moseley and enters Queensburgh at its Northdene suburb and turns east-south-east. As it traverses through Queensburgh, the road acts as the main road for the Escombe and Malvern suburbs and road becomes Sarnia Road at the Bellville Road intersection.

It leaves Queensburgh to enter the city of Durban at its Hillary suburb, turns south-east and crosses the N2 freeway. After crossing the N2, it turns north-east to enter Bellair, and turns south-east passing through the suburbs of Bellair and Sea View. It turns north-east again where it passes over the M7 again at an off-ramp in Rossburgh and continues north-northeast through Umbilo Industrial. It ends at an intersection with the R102 'Umbilo Road' which connects to the Durban CBD and Isipingo.

New Dumisani Makhaye Drive 
The Dumisani Makhaye Road (also known as P577 or MR577/Main Road 577) section of the M5 was opened on 2 December 2017 by former president Jacob Zuma for public use. The R1.3 billion project was the biggest road infrastructure development in South Africa since 2012 and also the most complex road project to be undertaken in years. It formed part of government’s nationwide programme to upgrade infrastructure.

Dumisani Makhaye Drive spans the uMngeni River and provides a strategic link between Duffs Road in KwaMashu and Dinkelman in New Germany. Significantly, the road will serve as a new alternative route to the King Shaka International Airport for traffic coming from the Pietermaritzburg and Pinetown areas, which will ease traffic congestion on the EB Cloete Interchange (Spaghetti Junction), it also cuts off 16 kilometres for traffic using the N3 to connect to the N2, makes the communities of Newlands, KwaMashu, Inanda, KwaDabeka, Clermont and Pinetown more closely connected and will help eradicate the legacy of colonialism and apartheid-based spatial planning. The road is named after the late struggle hero, Dumisani Makhaye, who dedicated his life to the fight against apartheid.

References

Metropolitan Routes in Durban